This list of electoral wards in Gwynedd includes council wards  which elect (or have elected) councillors to the local authorities in the county of Gwynedd, Wales.

Gwynedd was created with the merger of Anglesey with Caernarfonshire and Merionethshire in 1974, led by Gwynedd County Council. In 1996 Anglesey became a separate county and the District of Aberconwy passed to Conwy County Borough, The new Gwynedd local authority renamed itself Gwynedd Council.

Since 2004 there have been 71 county wards returning 75 county councillors to Gwynedd Council.

Wards of Gwynedd County Council

1973–1989
From the 1973 county election there were 64 wards, all except two of them elected one county councillor to the new Gwynedd County Council. The Bangor No.1 and the Ogwen wards elected two councillors.

1989–1996
Following The County of Gwynedd (Electoral Arrangements) Order 1988 the number of wards were decreased to 62, each electing one county councillor to Gwynedd County Council, taking effect from the May 1989 elections.

Wards of Gwynedd Council

1995–2004
The first elections to the new Gwynedd Council took place in 1995. Eighty three county councillors were elected from sixty nine electoral wards. as follows (numbers of councillors in brackets):

2004–

Following The County of Gwynedd (Electoral Changes) Order 2002 the number of wards were increased to 71, electing 75 councillors, taking effect from the 2004 elections.  Forty-five wards remained unchanged, eight wards had their boundaries amended and a further four had their representation reduced from two councillors to one. Most communities in the county also have a community council and community wards.

* = Communities which elect a community council

See also
 List of electoral wards in Wales

References

Gwynedd